Robert Abbott (1770April 5, 1852) was a Michigan politician.

Early life
Abbott was born in 1770 in Detroit, Michigan. His father was James Abbott, an early settler of Michigan who would have two other younger sons after Robert, James and Samuel.

Career
Abbott became a partner with his father, James, in the fur trading business. Abbott served as Michigan Territorial Treasurer from 1818 to 1836. Abbott served as Michigan Auditor General from 1836 to 1839, when he retired.

Personal life
Abbott was one of the first Methodists in Michigan. He built the first Methodist church in the state.

Death
Abbott died on April 5, 1852, in Coldwater, Michigan.

References

1770 births
1852 deaths
Michigan Democrats
Michigan Territory officials
Methodists from Michigan
Politicians from Detroit
Michigan Auditors General
American treasurers
19th-century American politicians